Wollenberg Grain and Seed Elevator was a historic grain and seed elevator located at Buffalo in Erie County, New York. It was built in 1912 and remained in service until 1987.  It was notable as the sole surviving example of a wooden or so-called "country style" elevator.  It was built in the style of the earliest elevators dating to the 1840s and had a capacity of 25,000 bushels.

It was destroyed by fire in October 2006.

It was listed on the National Register of Historic Places in 2003.

See also
 List of grain elevators

References

External links
Description - Wollenberg Grain and Seed Elevator, Buffalo as an Architectural Museum website

Historic American Engineering Record in New York (state)
Agricultural buildings and structures on the National Register of Historic Places in New York (state)
Infrastructure completed in 1912
Grain elevators in New York (state)
Buildings and structures in Buffalo, New York
1912 establishments in New York (state)
National Register of Historic Places in Buffalo, New York